The Henry French House, also known as the Salmon-French House, is a historic house located in the Port Fulton area of Jeffersonville, Clark County, Indiana in the United States. It was built about 1832, and is a two-story, Federal style brick dwelling with a rear ell added about 1839 to form an I-house. It has some Colonial Revival style design elements.

Henry French
Henry French (born December 19, 1812, in Philadelphia – May 4, 1878) was one of the first steamboat builders in the area. Between himself, his father Daniel French, and his brothers William and George, twenty steamboats were built at Port Fulton. Eventually, his business was swallowed by the larger Howard enterprise.

Today
In 1989, the house was added to the National Register of Historic Places. It is a private residence, and the current occupants have renovated it in a fashion similar to its original state.

See also
Howard Steamboat Museum, which is located a few blocks from the Henry French House

References 

Steamboats of the Ohio River
Jeffersonville, Indiana
Houses on the National Register of Historic Places in Indiana
Colonial Revival architecture in Indiana
Federal architecture in Indiana
Houses completed in 1832
Houses in Clark County, Indiana
National Register of Historic Places in Clark County, Indiana